Walter Pick (born 4 January 1917, date of death unknown) was a Czech alpine skier. He competed in the men's combined event at the 1936 Winter Olympics.

References

1917 births
Year of death missing
Czech male alpine skiers
Olympic alpine skiers of Czechoslovakia
Alpine skiers at the 1936 Winter Olympics
Place of birth missing